Shadeville is an unincorporated community in Wakulla County, Florida, United States.

It is home to Shadeville Elementary School and was home to Shadeville High School established with the efforts of Andrew Hargrett.

References

Unincorporated communities in Wakulla County, Florida
Tallahassee metropolitan area
Unincorporated communities in Florida